First Love is a 1970 film, written, directed, produced and starred in by Austrian director Maximilian Schell. It is an adaptation of Ivan Turgenev's 1860 novella of the same name, starring Schell, Dominique Sanda, and John Moulder-Brown.

Plot
For plot details, see First Love, the novella by Ivan Turgenev.

Cast
John Moulder-Brown	as Alexander
Dominique Sanda as Sinaida
Maximilian Schell as Father
Valentina Cortese as Mother
Marius Goring as Dr. Lushin
Dandy Nichols as Princess Zasekina
Richard Warwick as Lt. Belovzorov
Keith Bell as Count Malevsky
Johannes Schaaf as Nirmatsky
John Osborne as Maidanov

Reception
Roger Greenspun of The New York Times wrote of the film that "despite its pretentiousness, its prettiness, its 1,000 excesses—and to a degree perhaps because of them—it succeeds as vision even while it looks as if it were being suffocated by style." Roger Ebert of the Chicago Sun-Times gave the film two stars out of four and wrote, "The problem in 'First Love' (apart from the fact that the conclusion in no way emerges organically from the material) is that the whole movie is so smug in its sense of tragedy. In his directing debut, Maximilian Schell has taken a Turgenev story and stretched it out with silence, vast characterless landscapes, plenty of birds, some solitude and a visual style that doesn't help much." Gene Siskel of the Chicago Tribune gave the film an identical two-star grade and declared, "Schell neglects to pare Turgenev's story to the essential element of a young boy's love for a visiting neighbor, and attempts to include some of the Russian author's social comment on the superficiality of the ruling class. The result is a screenplay with vaulting ambition that is neither sensual nor witty." Variety called it "a sincere, affectionate and exquisitely pretty picture of youthful love—or infatuation—against the leisurely but already threatened backdrop of a world and society that was, but that symbolically also mirrors the present day." Charles Champlin of the Los Angeles Times stated, "At moments 'First Love' is overly elliptical and confusing, though the main advance of the narrative never falters. What is especially noteworthy is the film's power of suggestion and restraint in conveying an atmosphere highly charged with decadent sex." Gary Arnold of The Washington Post wrote, "Cinematographer Sven Nykvist puts on a swell show, performing one stunning feat of luminosity after another, but director Maximilian Schell is compulsively unilluminating about matters of theme and character and historical period and continuity."

Awards
Academy Awards, USA
1971 Nominated for Best Foreign Language Film (Switzerland)
 
German Film Awards
1971 Won the "Film Award in Gold" for "Outstanding Feature Film"
 
San Sebastián International Film Festival
1970 Maximilian Schell Won the "Silver Seashell" award

See also
 List of submissions to the 43rd Academy Awards for Best Foreign Language Film
 List of Swiss submissions for the Academy Award for Best Foreign Language Film

References

External links 
 

1970 films
1970 drama films
Swiss drama films
German drama films
German coming-of-age films
1970s English-language films
English-language German films
English-language Hungarian films
English-language Swiss films
1970s German-language films
West German films
Hungarian drama films
Films directed by Maximilian Schell
Films based on works by Ivan Turgenev
Films based on Russian novels
Films set in the 19th century
Films set in Russia
Adultery in films
1970s German films